Olle Karlsson (born 9 April 1969) is a Swedish professional golfer.

Karlsson turned professional in 1989 and joined the Challenge Tour where he won the 1993 Ramlösa Open. Between 1993 and 2002 he played over 200 events on the European Tour, finishing top-10 12 times, despite being plagued for years by injuries sustained in a serious car accident in February 1994.

Karlsson won the 1998 Open Novotel Perrier with Jarmo Sandelin, an unofficial money event on the European Tour. He was runner-up at the 1998 English Open behind Lee Westwood, and finished third at the 1995 Jersey Open and the 1996 Johnnie Walker Classic in Singapore. He peaked at 165 on the Official World Golf Ranking in 2001.

Professional wins (2)

Challenge Tour wins (1)

Other wins (1)

Results in major championships

CUT = missed the halfway cut
"T" = Tied
Note: Karlsson only played in The Open Championship.

References

External links

Swedish male golfers
European Tour golfers
Sportspeople from Halland County
People from Falkenberg
1969 births
Living people